Harder Than Ever is the debut studio album by American rapper Lil Baby. It was released on May 18, 2018 by 4 Pockets Full, Wolfpack Music Group, Quality Control Music, Motown and Capitol Records. The album features guest appearances from Starlito, Drake, Moneybagg Yo, Gunna, Young Thug, Offset, Lil Uzi Vert, and Hoodrich Pablo Juan. It also features production from Southside, Wheezy, Tay Keith, Quay Global and Turbo, among others.

Singles
The album's lead single, "Southside", was released for digital download on May 8, 2018, along with the music video. The song was produced by Southside. The music video was directed by Edgar Esteves.

The album's second single, "Yes Indeed" with Drake, was released on May 15, 2018. The song was produced by Wheezy.

Critical reception

Harder Than Ever was met with generally positive reviews. At Album of the Year, the album received an average score of 70 out of 100, based on two reviews.

Evan Rytlewski at Pitchfork gave the album mixed a review giving it 6.6 out of 10. Although he ended describing Lil Baby's debut, "Technically impressive: polished, efficient, but also kind of nondescript". He also stated that "Baby’s rapping isn’t any flashier than his fashion sense. He rhymes in a tuneful, half-sung stream of thought, sort of like a more nuanced Rich Homie Quan. On a purely technical level, he’s impressive."

Commercial performance
Harder Than Ever debuted at number three on the US Billboard 200 chart, earning 71,000 album-equivalent units (including 6,000 copies in pure album sales) in its first week. This became Lil Baby's first US top ten debut on the chart. In its second week, the album dropped to number seven on the chart, earning an additional 45,000 units. In its third week, the album dropped to number nine on the chart, moving 37,000 more units. In its fourth week, the album remained at number nine, earning 34,000 units, bringing its four-week total to 184,000 album-equivalent units. As of December 2018, the album has earned 717,000 album-equivalent units in the US. On February 28, 2020, the album was certified platinum by the Recording Industry Association of America (RIAA) for combined sales and album-equivalent units of over a million units in the United States.

Track listing

Notes
  signifies an uncredited co-producer

Personnel
Technical
 Quay Global – recording 
 Turbo – recording 
 Tony Wilson – additional editing 
 Mattazik Muzik – recording 
 Michael "MikFly" Dottin – mixing 
 Noah "40" Shebib – mixing 
 Colin Leonard – mastering

Charts

Weekly charts

Year-end charts

Decade-end charts

Certifications

References

2018 debut albums
Lil Baby albums
Quality Control Music albums
Motown albums
Capitol Records albums
Albums produced by Southside (record producer)
Albums produced by London on da Track
Albums produced by Tay Keith